Margaret Rebecca Dickinson (1821–1918) was a botanical artist who lived in north-east England and the Scottish Borders. Her watercolour paintings of plants collected around her homes, and other parts of the British Isles are in the archives of the Royal Horticultural Society and the Great North Museum: Hancock. As well as their artistic quality they provide information on how land use in the region has changed since her time.

Margaret Rebecca Dickinson was born in Newcastle-upon-Tyne on 22 July 1821 to William Ogle and Elizabeth (née Davidson) Dickinson, the youngest of their children. Her father was a tobacco and snuff manufacturer in Newcastle. She lived with her parents, three sisters and a brother. Her brother inherited the tobacco business. She did not marry and was of independent means because of the family's wealth.

She made a herbarium with over 1000 specimens and also produced many drawings and watercolour paintings of wild and cultivated flowers, mostly between 1846 and 1874, although she continuing to paint into the 1890s. Dickinson made use of shading to give her paintings a three-dimensional appearance. She recorded where each came from, and something about them on each painting. She probably travelled to collect the flowers. They were mostly collected in the region around Newcastle and the Scottish Borders where she lived, but some were from North Wales and Upper Teesdale while others came from Cirencester, Kent, Ireland and Devon. Comparison of some of her records with later information has shown significant changes in land use. She also made a few drawings of fungal fruiting bodies and mosses.

In the late 1850s her father retired and the family moved in Gattonside, near Melrose.

In 1868 she moved to Norham in Northumberland with her parents and one sister. When their parents died during the next two years, the sisters inherited the house (Tweed Villa) and lived there for the rest of their lives. She completed 42 paintings within the first three years of living in Norham. She died there on 9 December 1918.

In 1873 she became an honorary member of the Berwickshire Naturalists Club, contributed her paintings to exhibitions and attended meetings until 1908. She went on the society's field visit to Lindisfarne in 1874, painting several plants that she found there.

Legacy
Four hundred and fifty eight of her wildflower painting are held by the Natural History Society of Northumbria at the Great North Museum: Hancock in collaboration with the University of Newcastle, along with her field notes. She bequeathed  these to the museum in 1918, along with her collection of seaweeds, dried plants and paintings of fungi. The Royal Horticultural Society holds her Album of Narcissus that has 30 paintings of daffodil cultivars and species that she made between May 1886 and April 1893. This was bought at an auction in 1996.

From October 2022 until February 2023 there was an exhibition of her work in the Granary Gallery at the Maltings, Berwick-upon-Tweed.

References

External link
 On-line gallery of her paintings made available by the Natural History Society of Northumbria.

1821 births
1918 deaths
Botanical illustrators
People from Newcastle upon Tyne
19th-century artists
20th-century artists
19th-century women artists
20th-century women artists